Boronia amabilis, commonly known as Wyberba boronia, is a plant in the citrus family, Rutaceae and is endemic to a small area in southern Queensland. It is an erect shrub with many branches, pinnate leaves with hairy lower surfaces and pink, four-petalled flowers.

Description
They have between three and fifteen elliptic leaflets that are hairy on the lower side. The flowers are pink and are arranged in leaf axils, mainly in groups of between three and seven. The eight stamens alternate in length, the slightly shorter ones opposite the petals.

Taxonomy and naming
Boronia amabilis was first formally described in 1963 by Stanley Thatcher Blake and the description was published in Proceedings of the Royal Society of Queensland. The specific epithet (amabilis) is a Latin word meaning "lovely".

Distribution and habitat
This boronia grows in forest and woodland over granite between Wyberba and nearby Girraween National Park in south-eastern Queensland.

Conservation
Boronia amabilis is classified as "near threatened" under the Queensland Government Nature Conservation Act 1992.

References

amabilis
Flora of Queensland
Plants described in 1963
Taxa named by Stanley Thatcher Blake